National 

Loch Lee is a loch in Angus, Scotland south of the Grampian Mountains that is fed by the Water of Lee and the Water of Unich and outflows, via the Water of Lee, to a confluence with the Water of Mark to form the River North Esk. Queen Victoria described it as "a wild but not large lake, closed in by mountains, with a farm-house and a few cottages at its edge".

The loch supplies drinking water to the North Esk area.

The area is used by both walkers and anglers.

See also
List of reservoirs and dams in the United Kingdom

References

External links

Lee